John Samuel Pergine (born September 13, 1946) is a former American football linebacker in the National Football League for the Los Angeles Rams and the Washington Redskins.  He played college football at the University of Notre Dame and was drafted in the eleventh round of the 1968 NFL Draft. His nine collegiate career interceptions are the most ever by an Notre Dame linebacker.

References 

1946 births
Living people
American football linebackers
Los Angeles Rams players
Washington Redskins players
Notre Dame Fighting Irish football players